Kim Yong-min (Korean: 김용민, born 5 June 1976) is a South Korean lawyer and politician currently serving as the Member of the National Assembly for Namyangju 3rd constituency since 2020. He is one of the prominent pro-Cho Kuk MPs, along with Kim Nam-kuk and Choe Kang-wook.

Early career 
Born in Seoul, Kim attended Younghoon High School before majoring law at Hanyang University. He also studied Master of Engineering at KAIST.

After qualifying for the bar in 2003, he had been working at the Korean Bar Association and Lawyers for a Democratic Society (LDS); he served as the Deputy Secretary-General of LDS. In 2013, he defended Naneun Ggomsuda sued for breaching the Public Official Election Act. He was also in charge of defending Yoo Woo-seong, a North Korean defector who was falsely accused as a spy. During the 2016 political scandal, Kim revealed that Ko Young-tae was unfairly examined by the prosecution. In 2018, he defended Chung Bong-ju, who was involved in a sexual harassment controversy.

Political career 
On 7 February 2020, Kim Yong-min joined the Democratic Party, along with Kim Nam-kuk. Soon after, he became a potential candidate for Namyangju 3rd constituency that was held by Joo Kwang-deok. However, as he became the candidate for the constituency without any preselections, other pre-candidates protested; some even urged him to withdraw.

Following his confirmation as the Democratic candidate for Namyangju 3rd, Kim faced a challenge against the then MP Joo Kwang-deok, who was seeking re-election under the banner of the United Future Party (UFP). The competition was widely described as "Cho Kuk War", as Kim was a strong advocator to the former Minister of Justice Cho Kuk while Joo was a "sniper" against the former minister. In the election on 15 April, Kim defeated Joo with a margin of 4,286 votes.

On 16 April 2021, approximately after a year of his election, Kim launched his bid for the party's vice presidency in the by-election on 2 May. He received 17.73% and was elected with the highest votes in an upset victory. The Maeil Business Newspaper analysed that the outcome was due to strong supports of pro-Moon Jae-in members.

Political views 
A progressive figure, Kim is one of strong advocators to Cho Kuk, along with Kim Nam-kuk and Choe Kang-wook. He supports the prosecution reforms promoted by the Moon Jae-in government.

Election results

General elections

References

External links 
 Kim Yong-min on Facebook

1976 births
Living people
21st-century South Korean lawyers
Hanyang University alumni
KAIST alumni
Members of the National Assembly (South Korea)
People from Seoul